Mélody Johner (born 7 March 1984) is a Swiss equestrian. She represented Switzerland at the 2020 Summer Olympics and competed in Individual and Team Eventing on her horse Toubleu de Rueire. She finished 17th in the Individual competition and the Swiss team finished tenth.

References 

1984 births
Living people
Swiss female equestrians
Olympic equestrians of Switzerland
Equestrians at the 2020 Summer Olympics
Event riders